Rich Rider is the winningest men's basketball coach at California Lutheran University, with 345 wins and three SCIAC championships. He has also been the assistant athletic director at the university. He retired in November 2016, after 22 years at Cal Lutheran. He accumulated a record of 345-207 in his 22 seasons at CLU with three conference championships and one NCAA Division III tournament appearance. His total record as head coach is 481-311 (.607). Prior to his tenure at Cal Lutheran, Rider coached in the Boise School District. Before that, he was an assistant coach at Boise State, serving under Bobby Dye. He was the head coach at Chapman University from 1973–82, accumulating a 136-104 record and earning an NCAA berth in 1978.

Career

Rider attended Northeast Missouri State University where he gained undergraduate degrees in business administration (1968) and physical education (1970). He was an assistant at Utah from 1970-1973. From 1973-1982, he was the head coach at Chapman University, where he compiled a 136-94 record. He was an assistant Boise State from 1983-1992 after a one-year tenure as an assistant at Cal State Bakersfield. Rider was the athletic director in the Boise School District in Idaho when hired as head coach at Cal Lutheran.

Rider became the second-winningest coach for the Cal Lutheran basketball team in 1999 and later surpassed Don Bielke as the winningest basketball coach in school history.

References

Year of birth missing (living people)
Living people
American men's basketball coaches
Boise State Broncos men's basketball coaches
Cal Lutheran Kingsmen basketball coaches
Cal State Bakersfield Roadrunners men's basketball coaches
Chapman Panthers men's basketball coaches
College men's basketball head coaches in the United States
High school basketball coaches in Idaho
Utah Utes men's basketball coaches